Dick's Picks Volume 9 is the ninth live album in the Dick's Picks series of releases by the Grateful Dead. It was recorded on September 16, 1990, at the Madison Square Garden in New York City during the first tour with new keyboardists Vince Welnick and Bruce Hornsby.  This CD contains the full show from that night.

Another Grateful Dead album recorded during the same run of concerts at Madison Square Garden is Road Trips Volume 2 Number 1.

Enclosure

Included with the release is a single sheet of paper folded in half, yielding a four-page enclosure.  The front duplicates the cover of the CD and the back contains an oval-shaped, purple-tinted, monochrome photograph of the band on stage against a background of clouds that merges seamlessly with the clouds on the cover.  The two pages inside contain a wide black-and-white photograph of the entire band on stage along with lists of the contents of and credits for the release.

Track listing

Disc one
First set:
"Hell in a Bucket" (Bob Weir, Brent Mydland, John Barlow) – 7:03
"Cold Rain & Snow" (traditional, arranged by Grateful Dead) – 6:42
"Little Red Rooster" (Willie Dixon) – 10:21
"Stagger Lee" (Jerry Garcia, Robert Hunter) – 8:32
"Queen Jane Approximately" (Bob Dylan) – 7:47
"Tennessee Jed" (Garcia, Hunter) – 10:35
"Cassidy" (Weir, Barlow) – 6:26 →
"Deal" (Garcia, Hunter) – 9:48

Disc two
Second set:
"Samson and Delilah" (traditional, arranged by Weir) – 8:10
"Iko Iko" (James Crawford) – 10:15
"Looks Like Rain" (Weir, Barlow) – 8:47
"He's Gone" (Garcia, Hunter) – 16:26 →
"No MSG Jam" (Grateful Dead) – 7:50 →
"Drums" (Bill Kreutzmann, Mickey Hart) – 8:59 →

Disc three
Second set, continued:
"Space" (Grateful Dead) – 10:49 →
"Standing on the Moon" (Garcia, Hunter) – 9:28 →
"Lunatic Preserve" (Grateful Dead) – 5:45 →
"I Need a Miracle" (Weir, Barlow) – 5:19 →
"Morning Dew" (Bonnie Dobson, Tim Rose) – 13:12
Encore:
"It's All Over Now, Baby Blue" (Dylan) – 7:35

Personnel 
Grateful Dead
Jerry Garcia – lead guitar, vocals
Mickey Hart – drums, percussion
Bruce Hornsby – accordion, piano, synthesizer, vocals
Phil Lesh – bass guitar, vocals
Bill Kreutzmann – drums, percussion
Bob Weir – rhythm guitar, vocals
Vince Welnick – keyboards, vocals
Production
Dan Healy – recording
Dick Latvala – tape archivist
Jeffrey Norman – CD mastering
John Cutler – ferromagnetist
Gecko Graphics – package design
Susana Millman – photography

See also
Dick's Picks series
Grateful Dead discography

Notes

09
1997 live albums
Albums recorded at Madison Square Garden